Sama Kumaru Kathawa (Tale of the Prince of Peace), is a 2019 Sri Lankan Sinhala Buddhist epic biographical film directed by Nishantha Seneviratne and produced by Udara Palliyaguru for Guththila Strategic Solutions (Pvt) Ltd. It film stars Wimal Kumara de Costa, Rohana Beddage, Geetha Kanthi Jayakody and many new child cast. It is the 1332nd Sri Lankan film in the Sinhala cinema.

The film was released on 31 May 2019 to fill the film gap.

Plot
The film is based on the Buddhist epic novel called Pansiya Panas Jathaka Potha, which contain nearly 550 Jataka tales about the pre-incarnations of Gautama Buddha.

Cast
 Wimal Kumara de Costa
 Geetha Kanthi Jayakody
 Rohana Beddage
 Nalaka Daluwatte
 Himaya Bandara
 Dineth de Silva
 Nanda Wickramage
 Deshapriya Bandara
 Rahal Bulathsinhala
 Ashoka Priyadarshana
 Shan Fernando

Child cast
 Dimirthi Palliyaguru
 Deertha Palliyaguru
 Akash Vihanga as Sama Prince
 Rizon Lehansa

References

External links
 Official Facebook page
 Official trailer
 සාම කුමරු තිරයට

2019 films
2010s Sinhala-language films